Camden Town is a ward in the London Borough of Camden, in the United Kingdom that represents the area of the same name. The ward was created before the 2022 Camden London Borough Council election, and elects two councillors to Camden London Borough Council. Most of its area was previously in the Camden Town with Primrose Hill ward, which was abolished at the same time. In 2018, the ward had an electorate of 4,792. The Boundary Commission projects the electorate to rise to 5,709 in 2025.

Election results

Elections in the 2020s

References

Wards of the London Borough of Camden
Camden Town
2022 establishments in England